Lukas Forchhammer (born 18 September 1988)  is a Danish singer, songwriter, multi-instrumentalist, and former actor. He is best known as the lead singer and multi-instrumentalist for the Danish band Lukas Graham. As a child, Forchhammer starred in the Danish family movie series Krummerne.

Early life
Forchhammer grew up in an anarchist community in the center of Copenhagen called Freetown Christiania. His father, Eugene Graham, was Irish, and he spent half of his childhood in Ireland in Donegal and Dublin. His grandfather was from Wicklow in Ireland. In September 2012, Eugene died of a heart attack at the age of 61.

At age 8, Forchhammer joined the Copenhagen Boys Choir and developed not only an appreciation for classical music but a trained voice. He became fascinated with his father's Irish roots, the country's folk music as well as hip-hop – "Dr. Dre's 2001 changed my life," he said. He related to rap lyrics as he grew up surrounded by a lot of crime and drugs in his neighborhood. After spending six months in Buenos Aires, Forchhammer returned to Christiania in 2010, where he joined the writing team Future Animals – Don Stefano and Morten Ristorp, and formed the band Lukas Graham with friends from high school. He played at the 59th Annual Grammy Awards on 12 February 2017.

As a child, he also starred in the first three of the popular Danish movies Krummerne, where he played Grunk.

Personal life 

In September 2016, Forchhammer and his girlfriend Marie-Louise “Rillo” Schwartz had their first child, daughter Viola. In April 2020, their second daughter, Billie, was born.

Filmography

Film 
 Krummerne (1991)
 Krummerne 2: Stakkels Krumme (1992)
 Krummerne 3 - fars gode idé (1994)
 7 Years of Lukas Graham (2020)

Television 

 Krummernes Jul (1996)

References

Further reading

External links 

 
 
 
 

Lukas Graham
1988 births
Living people
Danish male singers
English-language singers from Denmark
Danish people of Irish descent
Singers from Copenhagen